Night in Gales is a German melodic death metal band.

History 
The band was formed in May 1995 by Christian Müller (vocals), Jens and Frank Basten (both guitarists), Tobias Bruchmann (bass and vocals) and Christian Bass (drums) in Voerde. After releasing the demo Sylphlike and the EP Razor, Müller left the band and was replaced by Björn Gooßes.

The band was signed by Nuclear Blast, with whom the band released Nailwork, following which they switched over to Massacre Records. A split with Massacre Records followed in 2001, during a European tour with God Dethroned, after which most members went off to focus on other projects.

A year later Christian Bass, the drummer, left the band, in order to concentrate on his Metalcore band Deadsoil. He was replaced in 2003 by Adriano Ricci. After a mini-tour with Fear My Thoughts and Bitterness, in 2005 the band released the free four-track EP Ten Years of Tragedy, to celebrate their tenth anniversary.

Discography 
 1995: Sylphlike (Demo)
 1996: Razor (Single)
 1997: Towards the Twilight
 1998: Thunderbeast (2008 Re-Release, Remastered)
 2000: Nailwork
 2001: Necrodynamic
 2005: Ten Years of Tragedy (EP)
 2011: Five Scars
 2014: Ashes & Ends
 2018: The Last Sunsets
 2020: Dawnlight Garden

External links 
 
 

German melodic death metal musical groups
Melodic death metal musical groups
Musical groups established in 1995